Cochylimorpha despectana is a species of moth of the family Tortricidae. It is found in Central Asia (Altai, Margelan, Alai).

References

Moths described in 1899
Cochylimorpha
Moths of Asia